The Gambler is a short novel by Fyodor Dostoevsky about a young tutor in the employment of a formerly wealthy Russian general. The novel reflects Dostoevsky's own addiction to roulette, which was in more ways than one the inspiration for the book: Dostoevsky completed the novel in 1866 under a strict deadline to pay off gambling debts.

Inspiration 

The Gambler treated a subject Fyodor Dostoevsky himself was familiar with: gambling. Fyodor Dostoevsky gambled for the first time at the tables at Wiesbaden in 1863. From that time till 1871, when his passion for gambling subsided, he played at Baden-Baden, Homburg, and Saxon-les-Bains frequently, often beginning by winning a small amount of money and losing far more in the end. He first mentions his interest in gambling in a letter he sent to his first wife's sister on 1 September 1863 describing his initial success:

Within a week he lost his winnings and was forced to beg his family for money. He wrote to his brother Mikhail on 8 September 1863:

Fyodor Dostoevsky then agreed to a hazardous contract with F. T. Stellovsky that if he did not deliver a novel of 12 or more signatures by 1 November 1866, Stellovsky would acquire the right to publish Dostoevsky's works for nine years, until 1 November 1875, without any compensation to the writer. He noted down parts of his story, then dictated them to one of the first stenographers in Russia and his wife-to-be, young Anna Grigorevna, who transcribed them and copied it neatly out for him. With her help, he was able to finish the book in time.

Plot summary
The first-person narrative is told from the point of view of Alexei Ivanovich, a tutor working for a Russian family living in a suite at a German hotel.
The patriarch of the family, The General, is indebted to the Frenchman de Grieux and has mortgaged his property in Russia to pay only a small amount of his debt.
Upon learning of the illness of his wealthy aunt, "Grandmother", he sends streams of telegrams to Moscow and awaits the news of her demise. His expected inheritance will pay his debts and gain Mademoiselle Blanche de Cominges's hand in marriage.

Alexei is hopelessly in love with Polina, the General's niece. She asks him to go to the town's casino and place a bet for her. After hesitations, he succumbs and ends up winning at the roulette table. He returns to her the winnings but she will not tell him the reason she needs money. She only laughs in his face (as she does when he professes his love) and treats him with cold indifference, if not downright malice. He only learns the details of the General's and Polina's financial state later in the story through his long-time acquaintance, Mr. Astley. Astley is a shy Englishman who seems to share Alexei's fondness of Polina. He comes from English nobility and has a good deal of money.

One day while Polina and Alexei are on a walk he swears an oath of servitude to her. He tells her while on a walk on the Schlangenberg (a mountain in the German town) that all she had to do was give the word and he would gladly walk off the edge and plummet to his death. Thereafter, they see Baron and Baroness Wurmerhelm. Polina dares him to insult the aristocratic couple and he does so with little hesitation. This sets off a chain of events that details Mademoiselle Blanche's interest in the General and gets Alexei fired as tutor of the General's children. Shortly after this, Grandmother shows up and surprises the whole party of debtors and indebted. She tells them all that she knows all about the General's debt and why the Frenchman and woman are waiting around the suite day after day. She leaves the party of death-profiteers by saying that none of them are getting any of her money. She then asks Alexei to be her guide around the town famous for its healing waters and infamous for its casino where the tables are stacked with piles of gold; she wants to gamble.

After being ushered to the roulette table, she plays and wins 13,000 Friedrichs d'ors (7000–8000 roubles), a significant amount of money. After a short return to the hotel, she comes back to roulette tables and she starts to get the bug; before she leaves the town, she's lost over a hundred thousand roubles in three days.

When Alexei gets back to his room after sending Grandmother off at the railway station, he's greeted by Polina. She shows him a letter where des Grieux says he has started legal proceedings to sell the General's properties mortgaged to him, but he is returning properties worth fifty thousand roubles to the General for Polina's benefit. des Grieux says he feels he had fulfilled all his obligations that way. Polina tells Alexei she is des Grieux's mistress and she wishes she had fifty thousand to fling at des Grieux's face. Upon hearing this, Alexei runs out of the room and to the casino where, in a feverish rush of excitement, he wins in few hours two hundred thousand florins (100,000 francs) and becomes a rich man. When he gets back to his room and the waiting Polina, he empties his pockets full of gold (Alexei estimates the weight to some ) and bank notes onto the bed. At first she accuses him of trying to buy her like des Grieux, but then she embraces him. They fall asleep on the couch. Next day, she asks for fifty thousand florins (25,000 francs) and when he gives it to her, she flings that money at Alexei's face and runs off to Mr. Astley (Polina and Mr. Astley had been secretly meeting and exchanging notes; she was supposed to meet Astley the night before, but had come by mistake to Alexei's room). Alexei doesn't see her again.

After learning that the General wouldn't be getting his inheritance and that Prince Nilski is penniless, Mademoiselle Blanche leaves the hotel with her mother/chaperone for Paris and seduces Alexei to follow her. Alexei goes with them, and they stay together for almost a month, he allowing Mlle Blanche to spend his entire fortune on Mlle Blanche's personal expenses, carriages and horses, dinner dances, and a wedding-party. After getting herself financially secured, in order to get an accepted status in the societies, Mlle Blanche unexpectedly marries the General, who has followed her to Paris.

Alexei starts to gamble to survive. One day he passes Mr. Astley on a park bench in Bad Homburg and has a talk with him. He finds out from Astley that Polina is in Switzerland and actually does love Alexei. Astley tells that Grandmother has died and left Polina and the children financially secured. The General has died in Paris. Astley gives him some money but shows little hope that he will not use it for gambling. Alexei goes home, initially promising himself to head for Switzerland the next day, yet recollects a past incident where he spent the last of his money on gambling and won big. Drawing parallels to his destitution now, and believing himself to be predestined to win, he makes up his mind to try his luck at the roulette tables one last time before leaving for Switzerland tomorrow.

Characters
In order of appearance:

Chapter 1

 Alexei Ivanovich – The narrator of the story; nobleman, wiseacre. Tutor of The General's young children Nadjenka and Misha. Pathologically in love with Polina Alexandrovna: "...two days ago on the Schlangenberg you challenged me, and I whispered: say the word and I'll jump into this abyss. If you had said the word then I would have jumped."
 The General – Sagorjanski, 55, a widower, in love with Mlle Blanche. In thrall to the Marquis Des Grieux since the latter made up a shortfall in public funds that the general had to cover before he could hand over his government post. 
 Polina Alexandrovna Praskovja – The General's stepdaughter. Spitefully manipulates the smitten narrator. Cares nothing for gambling. 
 Maria Filippovna – The General's sister
 Marquis des Grieux – The "little Frenchman", called "Monsieur le Comte" by the servants. Pompous, holds forth about finance at the dinner table. Deeply concerned that The General receive his inheritance so that des Grieux can be repaid. 
 Mr. Astley – Englishman, nephew of Lord Piebrook, serves as a steadying influence on Alexei Ivanovich. "I have never met a shyer man ... very nice and quiet". Far wealthier than des Grieux.

Chapter 3

 Mademoiselle Blanche de Cominges – The General's fiancée, assumed to be a French noblewoman. About 25, "tall and well built, with shapely shoulders ... her hair is black as ink, and there is a terrible amount of it, enough for two coiffures ... She dresses showily, richly, with chic, but with great taste". Returns the attentions of The General only insofar as she is interested in his prospective inheritance.

Chapter 6

 Baroness Wurmerhelm – "...short and extraordinarily fat, with a terribly fat, pendulous chin, so that her neck couldn't be seen at all. A purple face. Small eyes, wicked and insolent. She walks along as if she's doing everyone an honor."
 Baron Wurmerhelm – "...dry, tall. His face, as German faces usually are, is crooked and covered with a thousand tiny wrinkles; eyeglasses; forty-five years old ... Proud as a peacock. A bit clumsy".

Chapter 9

 Antonida Vasilevna Tarasevitcheva – The General's aunt, called la baboulinka (The Grandmother). "...formidable and rich, seventy-five years old ... a landowner and a Moscow grande dame ... perky, self-satisfied, straight-backed, shouting loudly and commandingly, scolding everybody..." Takes an instant liking to roulette, with disastrous consequences. 
 Potapyts – The Grandmother's butler
 Marfa – The Grandmother's maid, "a forty-year-old maiden, red-cheeked but already beginning to go gray..." 
 Madame de Cominges (no dialog) – Assumed to be Mlle Blanche's mother; called "Madame la Comtesse" by the servants.
 The Little Prince (no dialog) – Companion to Mlle Blanche when it appears there may be some trouble with The General's inheritance. 
 Fedosja (no dialog) – General's nanny
 Prince Nilski (no dialog)

Chapter 15
 Albert (no dialog) – Army officer in Paris, Mlle Blanche's lover

English translations
 Fred Whishaw
 C. J. Hogarth
 Constance Garnett
 Ivy Litvinov
 Jessie Coulson
 Jane Kentish
 Richard Pevear and Larissa Volokhonsky
 Hugh Aplin
 Ronald Meyer

Adaptations

The novel was the basis of a 1917 opera by Sergei Prokofiev, The Gambler.

Several films have been inspired by the book. The Great Sinner, a loose adaptation, starred Gregory Peck and Ava Gardner under the direction of Robert Siodmak in 1949. Le joueur, a 1958 french film adaptation by Claude Autant-Lara, starred by Gérard Philipe. A 1972 co-production of the USSR and Czechoslovakia by Lenfilm studio and Barrandov Studios, directed by Alexei Batalov, follows the book closely. 

There are two movies based on Dostoevsky's life during the time when he was writing the novel: the 1981 Soviet film Twenty Six Days from the Life of Dostoyevsky and the Hungarian director Károly Makk's 1997 film The Gambler.

A TV mini-series was broadcast on BBC in 1969, and rebroadcast by Masterpiece Theatre in the US.

A radio play version was aired by BBC Radio 4 in December 2010, written by Glyn Maxwell and directed by Guy Retallack.

A two-part modern-day adaptation, written by Dolya Gavanski (who also played "Polina") and entitled The Russian Gambler, was broadcast on BBC Radio 4 as part of its Classic Serial series in November 2013 and re-broadcast on BBC Radio 4 Extra in March 2018. The cast also included Ed Stoppard as Alexei.

References

External links

 
 
 
  Full text of The Gambler in the original Russian
 

1866 Russian novels
Novels by Fyodor Dostoevsky
Existentialist novels
Russian novels adapted into films
Gambling publications
Russian philosophical novels
Novels set in the 1860s
First-person narrative novels